WCMC (1230 AM) is a radio station broadcasting an oldies format. Licensed to Wildwood, New Jersey, United States, the station is currently owned by Equity Communications, L.P. Its studios are located on East Black Horse Pike in the West Atlantic City section of Egg Harbor Township, and its transmitter is located on West 19th Avenue in North Wildwood.

WCMC carries the live radio broadcast of the Philadelphia Phillies. Prior to 2010, the station carried an Adult Standards format and featured programming from ABC Radio/Citadel Media's Timeless satellite feed.   In 2010, the station began simulcasting sister station WMID. WCMC can be heard clearly as far south as Ocean City, MD, and as far north as Wilmington, DE.

See also
 WMID

References

External links

CMC
Radio stations established in 1951
1951 establishments in New Jersey